Martin Strobel (born 5 June 1986) is a German handball player for HBW Balingen-Weilstetten and the German national team.

He participated at the 2019 World Men's Handball Championship.

Achievements
Summer Olympics:
: 2016
European Championship:
: 2016

References

External links

1986 births
Living people
German male handball players
People from Rottweil (district)
Sportspeople from Freiburg (region)
Handball-Bundesliga players
Olympic handball players of Germany
Handball players at the 2016 Summer Olympics
Medalists at the 2016 Summer Olympics
Olympic bronze medalists for Germany
Olympic medalists in handball